"One Minute Man" is a  song written by American rapper Missy "Misdemeanor" Elliott. It was written and produced by Elliott and Timbaland for her third studio album Miss E... So Addictive (2001) and features guest vocals by rapper Ludacris. Incorporating elements of oriental music, the song deals with premature ejaculation. Elliott, a rapper, also sings on the record.

The track was released as the album's second single in 2001 and peaked at number 5 on the US Billboard Hot 100 chart. In the United Kingdom, the single reached number 10 and became Elliott's second consecutive song to reach the top ten. Elsewhere "One Minute Man" failed to chart within the top 20.

Rapper Trina appears alongside Elliott and Ludacris in the video version remix of the song. A third version featuring Jay-Z was included as a bonus track on Miss E... So Addictive. Elliott performed "One Minute Man" and "Get Ur Freak On" at the 2001 MTV Video Music Awards as a medley and a tribute to Aaliyah.

The song includes samples from the 1976 David Pomeranz song "Greyhound Mary".

Reception 
Writing for Pitchfork, Dan Kilian, a music critic, describes the first half of Miss E... So Addictive as "a six-track attack that's rare for any genre" and notes that "Missy harmonizes with herself on 'One Minute Man', again keeping the beat simple under a squeaking synthesizer hook, and this time allowing Ludacris to reprise the record's freak-getting-on theme."

Music video
A music video for "One Minute Man" was directed by Dave Meyers. Vibe editor Shenequa Golding called the visuals a "scandalous single fun. Whether it be a headless Missy dancing in the corner, or her sliding across the marble floor with the introduction of the fast-paced "Whatcha Gonna Do," the video proved to be more stimulating than the one minute some men can offer [...] All jokes aside, Missy could've taken a cliche uber sexual approach, but it's Missy, when has she ever been cliche or predictable?"

Charts

Weekly charts

Year-end charts

References 

2001 singles
Ludacris songs
Missy Elliott songs
Song recordings produced by Timbaland
Trina songs
Songs written by Missy Elliott
Songs written by Ludacris
Songs written by Timbaland
Music videos directed by Dave Meyers (director)
2000 songs
Elektra Records singles